The men's javelin throw event at the 1990 Commonwealth Games was held on 3 February at the Mount Smart Stadium in Auckland.

Results

References

Javelin
1990